This is a list of international prime ministerial trips made by Anthony Albanese, the 31st Prime Minister of Australia. As of December 2022, Albanese has made twelve international trips to ten sovereign states since assuming office on 23 May 2022.

Summary
The number of visits per country where Albanese traveled are:
 One: Spain, UAE, France, UK, Ukraine, Cambodia, Thailand, Papua New Guinea, India, United States
 Two: Japan, Indonesia, Fiji

2022

2023

Upcoming trips

Multilateral meetings
Prime Minister Albanese is scheduled to attend the following summits during his prime ministership:

See also
 Albanese government
 Foreign relations of Australia
 List of international prime ministerial trips made by Jacinda Ardern
 List of international prime ministerial trips made by Scott Morrison

References

2022 in international relations
Australian prime ministerial visits
Diplomatic visits by heads of government
Foreign relations of Australia
Albanese
Lists of diplomatic trips
Anthony Albanese